John Keith Bousfield, M.C. (17 November 1893 – 29 October 1945) was a British army officer, general manager of the Asiatic Petroleum Company and member of the Legislative Council of Hong Kong.

Biography 
He was the son of W. R. Bousfield, K.C., Member of Parliament (1892–1906). He was educated at Rugby School in Warwickshire, and Gonville and Caius College, Cambridge.

On the outbreak of the First World War, he was commissioned into the Royal Engineers in November 1914. He embarked for France in August 1915. In early 1917 he was attached as an observer to 57 Squadron of the Royal Flying Corps. He made a number of reconnaissance flights over German lines, but on 6 April 1917 his aircraft was brought down and he was taken prisoner of war. He was interned at Karlsruhe, Krefeld, Ströhen and later at Holzminden prisoner-of-war camp. On 24 July 1918, he and 28 other officers escaped from the Holzminden camp through a tunnel which had taken 10 months to dig. He made his way to the Dutch frontier in the clothes of a prisoner of war and then returned to England. He received the Military Cross from King George V at Windsor for his reconnaissance work during the Battle of Somme in 1916.

He later became the general manager of the Asiatic Petroleum Company and also the Asiatic Petroleum Co. (South China). He was appointed a member of the Legislative Council of Hong Kong in 1939 as the representative of the Hong Kong General Chamber of Commerce during the absence of A. L. Shields. He was vice-chairman of the chamber. He was elected chairman of the chamber in 1940.

References

External links

1893 births
1945 deaths
People educated at Uppingham School
Alumni of Gonville and Caius College, Cambridge
Hong Kong businesspeople
British Army personnel of World War I
Royal Flying Corps officers
Recipients of the Military Cross
British expatriates in Hong Kong
British World War I prisoners of war
World War I prisoners of war held by Germany
Members of the Legislative Council of Hong Kong
Royal Engineers officers
20th-century British businesspeople